The Kolan River is a river located in the Bundaberg Region, Queensland, Australia.

The river rises in the Bobby Range, below the Dawes Range in the north-east, and the Burnett Range in the south-west. The river flows generally south and then east towards the settlement of Toweran where the Bruce Highway crosses the river. From this point the river flows south by east and enters Lake Monduran, formed in 1978 by the damming of the river in order to mitigate severe flooding in the river's lower reaches. The lower reaches of the river are surrounded by sugar cane fields. The Mouth of Kolan River Regional Park is a protected area at the river mouth. The river descends  over its  course.

Other water storage facilities that are supplied with water from the river include the Bucca Weir and the Kolan Barrage.

Macfadyena unguis-cati, commonly known as Cats Claw Creeper, is a rapidly growing clinging vine that has been killing gumtrees on the banks of the Kolan River, leaving damaged tracts of riverbank. In 2007 a water hyacinth outbreak occurred within the Kolan River system.

The name of the river is derived from a Kabi language expression, kalang, meaning good.

See also

References

Rivers of Queensland
Wide Bay–Burnett